Sir Herbert Kortright McDonnell Sisnett (1862–3 June 1937) was a British lawyer and colonial judge.

The son of G. W. Sisnett, Rector of St George's, Barbados, Sisnett was educated in Barbados at The Lodge School and Harrison College, before being called to the English bar by the Inner Temple in 1896. He was Registrar General and District Commissioner, Belize, British Honduras, in 1907–12; he also acted at Attorney General and Chief Justice of British Honduras on several occasions during the period. In 1913–21, he was Stipendiary Magistrate in British Guiana, and acted as Attorney General of British Guiana in 1920–21.

He was senior Puisne Judge in Jamaica during 1921–22, before being appointed Chief Justice of British Honduras in 1922. He was sole arbitrator in the Shufeldt claim between the United States and Guatemala in 1930. He was knighted in 1927 and retired in 1931.

A philatelist, Sisnett was a Fellow of the Royal Philatelic Society London.

Sisnett married in 1893 Mary Hélène, daughter of J. C. Deane, Barbados, and had issue.

References 

 https://www.ukwhoswho.com/view/10.1093/ww/9780199540891.001.0001/ww-9780199540884-e-217139

Knights Bachelor
1862 births
1937 deaths
British philatelists
Fellows of the Royal Philatelic Society London
British Honduras judges
British Guiana judges
Colony of Jamaica judges
20th-century Jamaican judges